Santa Isabel  is a small town in the Mexican state of Chihuahua. It serves as the municipal seat for the surrounding municipality of Santa Isabel.

As of 2010, the town of Santa Isabel had a population of 1,378, down from 1,412 as of 2005.

References

Populated places in Chihuahua (state)